Pat Holmes is an Irish former Gaelic football manager and player.

He won a North Mayo Junior Championship in 1986 with Moygownagh. Work commitments caused him to join Castlebar for four years in the early ‘90s where he won Mayo and Connacht club championship medals in 1993.

He was very much involved in Mayo's All-Ireland runs in 1996 and 1997 and is the holder of six Connacht Senior Medals, a Connacht U21 Medal and a Hogan Cup Medal.

He was captain in 1994 when Mayo lost to Leitrim in the Connacht Final and is a former pupil of St Jarlath's College in Tuam, with whom he won an All-Ireland medal in 1984. He also earned an All Star in 1996.

Career
He played in defence for the senior Mayo county team from 1988 to 1999 before taking over as manager from 2000 to 2002. He returned again to the Mayo management team, serving as joint-manager of the team from 2014 until 2015 with Noel Connelly.

Holmes along with Noel Connelly left as joint managers of the Mayo team in 2015 after one year in charge due to a player revolt and the threat of a strike by the team if they remained in charge.

Honours

Player 
 Connacht Senior Football Championship (1): 1988, 1989, 1992, 1993, 1996, 1997
 Connacht Under-21 Football Championship (1): 1986
 Connacht club Senior Football Championship (with Castlebar Mitchels): 1993
 North Mayo Junior Championship (with Moygownagh): 1986

Manager
 Mayo
 National Football League Division 1 : 2001
 Connacht Senior Football Championship (1): 2015
 All-Ireland Under-21 Football Championship (1): 2006

References

 

Year of birth missing (living people)
Living people
Gaelic football backs
Gaelic football managers
Mayo inter-county Gaelic footballers
People educated at St Jarlath's College
People from Castlebar